New York's 29th State Assembly district is one of the 150 districts in the New York State Assembly in the United States. It has been represented by Democrat Alicia Hyndman since 2016.

Geography 
District 29 is located in Queens, comprising the neighborhoods of Jamaica, Hollis, Springfield Gardens, Rosedale, Lauralton, and St Albans.

Recent election results

2022

2020

2018

2016

2015 Special Election

2014

2012

References 

29
Queens, New York